Stephen II (died 1096) was a German nobleman and an early member of the House of Sponheim. He succeeded his father, Stephen I, as count of Sponheim around 1080. Around 1092 Stephen married Sophia of Formbach. Stephen had several children with Sophia, including Meginard I, who succeeded him as count of Sponheim and Jutta, abbess of the Benedictine monastery on Disibodenberg and teacher of Hildegard of Bingen.

References 
E. Hlawitschka, 'Die 'Verwandtenehe' des Gegenkönigs Hermann von Salm und seiner Frau Sophie. Ein Beitrag zu den Familienbeziehungen der rheinischen Ezzonen/Hezeliniden und des Grafenhauses von Formbach/Vormbach,' in Festschrift für Andreas Kraus zum 80. Geburtstag. Schriftenreihe zur bayerischen Landesgeschichte, Band 140, (Verlag C.H. Beck München 2002).
 J. Mötsch, ‘Genealogie der Grafen von Sponheim,’ Jahrbuch für westdeutsche Landesgeschichte 13 (1987), 63-179.

Notes

11th-century births
1096 deaths
Year of birth unknown
House of Sponheim

Counts of Germany